Invizimals: The Lost Kingdom is a 2013 video game for the PlayStation 3, and was released on 30 October 2013 in Europe simultaneously with Invizimals: The Alliance.

Reception

The game has a score of 50% on Metacritic.

References

External links

2013 video games
Adventure games
PlayStation 3 games
PlayStation 3-only games
Sony Interactive Entertainment games
Video games developed in Spain
Multiplayer and single-player video games
Invizimals
Magenta Software games
Novarama games